Lake Township is one of the seventeen townships of Logan County, Ohio, United States. As of the 2010 census, the population was 12,534, making it the largest in population in Logan County.

Geography
Located at the center of the county, it borders the following townships:
McArthur Township - north
Rushcreek Township - northeast
Jefferson Township - east
Liberty Township - south
Harrison Township - west

Most of the city of Bellefontaine, the county seat of Logan County, is located in Lake Township, occupying all but the northern, southeastern, and southwestern parts of the township.

Name and history
Lake Township was organized in 1818. The township took its name from Silver Lake, which is now located in Harrison Township. Statewide, other Lake Townships are located in Ashland, Stark, and Wood counties.

Government
The township is governed by a three-member board of trustees, who are elected in November of odd-numbered years to a four-year term beginning on the following January 1. Two are elected in the year after the presidential election and one is elected in the year before it. There is also an elected township fiscal officer, who serves a four-year term beginning on April 1 of the year after the election, which is held in November of the year before the presidential election. Vacancies in the fiscal officership or on the board of trustees are filled by the remaining trustees.

In the elections of November 2007, James Wish was elected without opposition in the election for the position of township trustee, while Bill Boy defeated Chris Dinovo in the election for the position of township fiscal officer.

Transportation
Highways in Lake Township include U.S. Routes 33 and 68, and State Routes 47 and 540.

References

External links
County website
County and township map of Ohio
Detailed Logan County map

Townships in Logan County, Ohio
1811 establishments in Ohio
Populated places established in 1811
Townships in Ohio